Hume Award may refer to:

 David M. Hume Memorial Award, awarded annually by the National Kidney Foundation in the United States
 Fred J. Hume Award, awarded annually to the most "unsung hero" player of the Vancouver Canucks of the National Hockey League, as voted by fans
 Sandy Hume Memorial Award for Excellence in Political Journalism, awarded annually by the National Press Club in the United States

See also
 William Hume-Rothery Award